The Rainbow Reels Queer and Trans Film Festival is an annual LGBTQ film festival in Kitchener-Waterloo, Ontario.

First staged in 2001, the festival was launched by WPIRG and staged primarily at the University of Waterloo's Davis Centre. It subsequently expanded off-campus, with most films screening at the Princess Twin theatre, and became an independent event with its own separate organizing committee in the early 2010s.

In addition to film, the festival also schedules a selection of live theatrical and musical performances.

References

External links

LGBT film festivals in Canada
Festivals in the Regional Municipality of Waterloo
Culture of Kitchener, Ontario
Film festivals in Ontario
Film festivals established in 2001
2001 establishments in Ontario
LGBT in Ontario